The Governor of the Bank of Uganda is chief executive officer and the chairman of the board of directors of the Bank of Uganda. The current governor was Emmanuel Tumusiime-Mutebile, who was first appointed to this position on 1 January 2001, and was re-appointed for a second five-year term on 1 January 2006. In November 2010, he was re-appointed for a third five-year term, effective 12 January 2011. In December 2015, he was re-appointed for a fourth five-year term, effective 12 January 2016.

Appointment
The Bank of Uganda Act stipulates that the governor and deputy governor of the Bank of Uganda shall be appointed by the President of Uganda with the consent of the Cabinet. The governor and deputy governor shall be appointed for a period of five years and shall be eligible for reappointment. The act further stipulates that the governor and deputy governor shall not, while in office, take up any other office or employment, whether paid or unpaid. It is a requirement, that both the governor and deputy governor, shall be individuals with recognised financial or banking experience.

Responsibilities
The responsibilities of the Governor of the Bank of Uganda include the following:

 Acting as the supervisor of the bank's staff, assigning duties, and receiving and acting on reports from the staff.
 Convening and presiding over the meetings of the bank's board of directors.

Governors of the Bank of Uganda (Year 1966 to present)
The following individuals have served as "Governor of the Bank of Uganda", since the institution was founded in 1966.

See also
 Bank of Uganda
 Louis Kasekende

References